

Southern Kangaroo Island Marine Park (formerly Southern Kangaroo Island Commonwealth Marine Reserve) is a marine protected area located south of South Australia in waters within the Australian Exclusive economic zone to the south of Kangaroo Island and ranging in depth from  to .  

It was gazetted in November 2012.   It was renamed on 11 October 2017.

It is part of a group of Australian marine parks managed by the Department of the Environment  and Energy known as the South-west Marine Park Network.  It is bounded on its northern side by the Southern Kangaroo Island Marine Park which is managed by the Government of South Australia.  

The marine park includes an ecosystem representative of the bioregion known as the "Spencer Gulf Shelf Province", a "key ecological feature" consisting of a feature known as the "Kangaroo Island Pool" and the associated "Eyre Peninsula upwelling" both notable for their "high productivity, breeding and feeding aggregations", a calving area for southern right whale and feeding areas for both the Australian sea lion and the great white shark.  

The marine park is classified as an IUCN Category VI protected area.

See also
Protected areas managed by the Australian government

References

External links
Southern Kangaroo Island Commonwealth Marine Reserve webpage on the Protected Planet website

Australian marine parks
Protected areas established in 2012
2012 establishments in Australia